Aphomia isodesma is a species of snout moth in the genus Aphomia. It was described by Edward Meyrick in 1886 and is known from Fiji.

References

Moths described in 1886
Tirathabini
Moths of Fiji